Abu Tabareh-ye Yek (also Romanized as Ābū Ţabāreh-ye Yek; also known as Abootabareh and Abū Tabāreh) is a village in Gazin Rural District, Raghiveh District, Haftgel County, Khuzestan Province, Iran. At the 2006 census, its population was 149, in 28 families.

References 

Populated places in Haftkel County